Arthur Saunders Thomson (29 December 1816 – 4 November 1860) was a notable New Zealand military surgeon, medical scientist, writer and historian. He was born in Arbroath, Angus, Scotland in 1816. 

He joined the British Army in 1838 as an assistant surgeon and was stationed in India until 1847. There, he wrote about the epidemic of fever among his regiment during the monsoon season. Upon his return to England, he was appointed surgeon to the 58th Regiment of Foot and sent to New Zealand. In 
New Zealand he wrote extensively about disease statistics among Māori and European populations and climatology.

Thompson's book The Story of New Zealand: Past and Present, Savage and Civilized (1859) is generally considered to be the first scholarly history of the island country.

He was promoted to surgeon major in 1858 and was sent back to England. A year later, he was placed in charge of the hospital steamship Mauritius and sent to China. He died there in 1860.

References

External links
  The Story of New Zealand: Past and Present, Savage and Civilized. London: John Murray (1859).

1816 births
1860 deaths
New Zealand military personnel
19th-century New Zealand historians
New Zealand military doctors
Scottish emigrants to New Zealand